Nowogród ("New Town") may refer to the following places:
Nowogród in Podlaskie Voivodeship (north-east Poland)
Nowogród Bobrzański, a town in Zielona Góra County, Lubusz Voivodeship, Poland
Nowogród, Gmina Zbójna, a village in the administrative district of Gmina Zbójna, within Łomża County, Podlaskie Voivodeship, Poland
Nowogród, Kuyavian-Pomeranian Voivodeship, a village in the administrative district of Gmina Golub-Dobrzyń, within Golub-Dobrzyń County, Kuyavian-Pomeranian Voivodeship, Poland
Nowogród, Lublin Voivodeship, a village in the administrative district of Gmina Łęczna, within Łęczna County, Lublin Voivodeship, Poland
Gmina Nowogród Bobrzański, an urban-rural gmina in Zielona Góra County, Lubusz Voivodeship, Poland
Gmina Nowogród, an urban-rural gmina in Łomża County, Podlaskie Voivodeship, Poland
Novhorod-Siversky, a historic city in the Chernihiv Oblast (province) of Ukraine

See also
Novgorod (disambiguation)
Novigrad (disambiguation)